The colón (₡) refers to two Central American currencies:

 the Costa Rican colón (CRC), used in Costa Rica since 1896
 the Salvadoran colón (SVC), used in El Salvador from 1892 until 2001, when it was replaced by the American dollar

Symbol
The symbol for the colón is "₡", written as a capital letter C crossed by two diagonal strokes. In Unicode, it is at code point  and may be typed on many English language Microsoft Windows keyboards with the shortcut +.

Currencies of Costa Rica
Currencies of El Salvador
Currency symbols